Mihailo Petrović (born 18 October 1957) is a Serbian football coach and former football player He is the currently manager J1 League club of Hokkaido Consadole Sapporo. He also holds an Austrian passport.

Career
Petrović joined Japanese club Sanfrecce Hiroshima in June 2006. In his first full season in charge, Sanfrecce reached the final of the Emperor's Cup but were relegated to J2. The side recovered in style, storming to the title with a haul of 100 points. Their excellent form continued into the next season and Sanfrecce secured a 4th-placed finish on their return to J1, qualifying for the AFC Champions League for the first time in the club's history. It was announced on 9 November 2011 that Petrović would not be renewing his contract for the 2012 season.

On 14 December 2011, Petrović was appointed to guide the Japanese side Urawa Red Diamonds with a two-year contract. After  seasons in charge of the Saitama outfit, he was sacked on 31 July 2017.

On 10 January 2018, he was appointed manager of Hokkaido club Hokkaido Consadole Sapporo.

On 24 October 2020, Petrović became the first foreign manager to achieve 200 wins in the J. League.

On 4 March 2023, Petrović managed his 525th game in the J. League, breaking Akira Nishino's record for most games coached in J. League history.

Managerial statistics
Update; 18 March 2023

 Results from penalty shoot-outs are counted as draws in this table.

Honours

Manager
Sanfrecce Hiroshima
 Japanese Super Cup: 2008
 J.League Division 2: 2008

Urawa Red Diamonds
 J.League Cup: 2016

Individual
 J.League Manager of the Year: 2018

References

External links

Profile at Reprezentacija.rs 

1957 births
Living people
Sportspeople from Loznica
Yugoslav footballers
Yugoslavia international footballers
Serbian footballers
Austrian footballers
Association football midfielders
J1 League managers
J2 League managers
Yugoslav First League players
Austrian Football Bundesliga players
Red Star Belgrade footballers
FK Rad players
NK Olimpija Ljubljana (1945–2005) players
GNK Dinamo Zagreb players
SK Sturm Graz players
Serbian football managers
Austrian football managers
SK Sturm Graz managers
Sanfrecce Hiroshima managers
Urawa Red Diamonds managers
Hokkaido Consadole Sapporo managers
Expatriate football managers in Japan
NK Olimpija Ljubljana (1945–2005) managers